Dorf an der Pram is a municipality in the district of Schärding in the Austrian state of Upper Austria.

Geography
Dorf an der Pram lies in the Innviertel. About 8 percent of the municipality is forest, and 80 percent is farmland.

References

Cities and towns in Schärding District